Yaniv Azran (born 12 May 1983) is a retired Israeli footballer.

Playing career
Azran grew up in the youth system of F.C. Ashdod in Israel.

After finishing the 2005–06 season in Ashdod and seeing little playing time, Nir Klinger signed Azran to a two-year contract worth $120,000 a year while managing Paralimni. After a failed stint playing in Cyprus, he returned to Ashdod and finished the season with 15 goals. His achievement did not go unnoticed by European clubs, he was said to be on his way to Spain if he could secure a Polish passport (Azran is of Polish descent on his mother's side).

At the beginning of 2007–08 season Azran transferred Maccabi Tel Aviv for a fee of $775,000. In his first season, he managed to score only one goal for the team which since then has been his only goal mostly because Azran spent most of the next two seasons on the injured list with various knee and ankle injuries. In 4 seasons with the club he only managed to play 34 games in all competitions, scoring 4 goals and providing 4 assists.

He won a lawsuit against the club after they haven't paid most of his salary in his last season with Maccabi, in November 2012 Maccabi was ordered to pay $240,000 to Azran as compensation.

In February 2012 he announced his retirement from the game.

Honours
 Toto Cup winner: 2008–09
 Toto Cup runner-up: 2001–02, 2004–05, 2005–06

Footnotes

1983 births
Living people
Footballers from Ashdod
Israeli footballers
Maccabi Tel Aviv F.C. players
F.C. Ashdod players
Enosis Neon Paralimni FC players
Israeli Premier League players
Cypriot First Division players
Israeli expatriate footballers
Expatriate footballers in Cyprus
Israeli expatriate sportspeople in Cyprus
Israel under-21 international footballers
Association football forwards